Obryta  is a village in the administrative district of Gmina Warnice, within Pyrzyce County, West Pomeranian Voivodeship, in north-western Poland.
 
The village has a population of approximately 250.

See also 

 History of Pomerania

References

Obryta